Food For Less was an Australian discount supermarket chain owned by Woolworths Limited. It was originally established in Queensland, where a discount 'food barn' chain operating as "Jack the Slasher" was acquired by Safeway USA and when Woolworths took over Safeway in 1990. The stores were positioned as low-cost locations that sold dry groceries and frozen perishables.

It later expanded into New South Wales and became the low-cost supermarket chain for Woolworths, competing with Franklins No Frills, Coles Myer's Bi-Lo and Aldi. The chain expanded when Woolworths purchased the Franklins stores in New South Wales and Queensland, and converted them to the Food For Less brand.

In 2010 Woolworths began to shut down the brand. The stores were either converted into regular Woolworths stores or closed. By 2019 the shutdown was complete and no more Food For Less stores exist. The market niche that Food For Less operated in was also filled by Aldi, which opened business in 2001 and had 565 stores in Australia in 2019.

See also
Food-4-Less—US chain owned by Kroger

References

Defunct supermarkets of Australia
Woolworths Group (Australia)
Australian grocers